There are at least 114 named mountains in Park County, Montana.
 Antelope Butte, el. 
 Antelope Butte, el. 
 Arrow Peak, el. 
 Ash Mountain, el. 
 Baboon Mountain, el. 
 Baker Mountain, el. 
 Bald Knob, el. 
 Bald Mountain, el. 
 Black Mountain, el. 
 Black Mountain, el. 
 Black Mountain, el. 
 Boulder Mountain, el. 
 Buffalo Butte, el. 
 Buffalo Mountain, el. 
 Bull Mountain, el. 
 Cairn Mountain, el. 
 Canyon Mountain, el. 
 Carbonate Mountain, el. 
 Cedar Butte, el. 
 Chico Peak, el. 
 Choke-To-Death Butte, el. 
 Cinnabar Mountain, el. 
 Conical Peak, el. 
 Courthouse Mountain, el. 
 Crevice Mountain, el. 
 Crow Mountain, el. 
 Crown Butte, el. 
 Crystal Cross Mountain, el. 
 Cutoff Mountain, el. 
 Deaf Jim Knob, el. 
 Dexter Point, el. 
 Dome Mountain, el. 
 Electric Peak, el. 
 Elephanthead Mountain, el. 
 Elk Mountain, el. 
 Emigrant Peak, el. 
 Fisher Mountain, el. 
 Glacier Peak, el. 
 Gobblers Knob, el. 
 Granite Peak, el. 
 Granite Peak, el. 
 Green Mountain, el. 
 Hanlon Hill, el. 
 Hellroaring Mountain, el. 
 Henderson Mountain, el. 
 High Mountain, el. 
 Hole-In-The Rock, el. 
 Horse Mountain, el. 
 Horseshoe Mountain, el. 
 Hummingbird Peak, el. 
 Ibex Mountain, el. 
 Iceberg Peak, el. 
 Iddings Peak, el. 
 Iron Mountain, el. 
 Kavanaugh Hills, el. 
 Knowles Peak, el. 
 Lion Mountain, el. 
 Livingston Peak, el. 
 Lookout Mountain, el. 
 Mans Foot Mountain, el. 
 Marten Peak, el. 
 Meldrum Mountain, el. 
 Meridian Peak, el. 
 Middle Mountain, el. 
 Miller Mountain, el. 
 Mineral Hill, el. 
 Mineral Mountain, el. 
 Mineral Mountain, el. 
 Monitor Peak, el. 
 Moolsh Hill, el. 
 Mount Abundance, el. 
 Mount Cowen, el. 
 Mount Delano, el. 
 Mount Fox, el. 
 Mount Greeley, el. 
 Mount McKnight, el. 
 Mount Rae, el. 
 Mount Villard, el. 
 Mount Wallace, el. 
 Mount Wilse, el. 
 Mount Zimmer, el. 
 Mystic Mountain, el. 
 Oregon Mountain, el. 
 Oxide Mountain, el. 
 Palmer Mountain, el. 
 Pine Mountain, el. 
 Rattlesnake Butte, el. 
 Red Mountain, el. 
 Republic Mountain, el. 
 Roundhead Butte, el. 
 Sawtooth Mountain, el. 
 Sawtooth Mountain, el. 
 Scotch Bonnet Mountain, el. 
 Sheep Mountain, el. 
 Sheep Mountain, el. 
 Sheep Mountain, el. 
 Sheep Mountain, el. 
 Sheepherder Peak, el. 
 Shooting Star Mountain, el. 
 Sliding Mountain, el. 
 Sphinx Mountain, el. 
 Sugar Loaf Mountain, el. 
 Sugarloaf Mountain, el. 
 Sunlight Peak, el. 
 Sunset Peak, el. 
 Sunset Peak, el. 
 The Needles, el. 
 The Pyramid, el. 
 Turkey Pen Peak, el. 
 War Eagle Mountain, el. 
 Wilsall Peak, el. 
 Wineglass Mountain, el. 
 Wolf Mountain, el. 
 Wolverine Peak, el.

See also
 List of mountains in Montana
 List of mountain ranges in Montana

Notes

Park